The term homolysis generally means breakdown (lysis) to equal pieces (homo = same). There are separate meanings for the word in chemistry and biology:
 Homolysis (biology), the fact that the dividing cell gives two equal-size daughter cells
 Homolysis (chemistry), a chemical bond dissociation of a neutral molecule generating two free radicals

See also 
 Heterolysis (disambiguation)

Science disambiguation pages